William Thomas Hobbins (born February 18, 1946) is a former Air Force general, commander of U.S. Air Forces Europe; commander of Air Component Command, Ramstein; and director of Joint Air Power Competence Center, Kalkar, Germany.

Hobbins was raised in Ephrata, Pennsylvania, and entered the Air Force in December 1969 as a graduate of Officer Training School. He has commanded two tactical fighter wings and a composite air group. He has served as the director of plans and operations for U.S. Forces Japan, director of plans and policy for U.S. Atlantic Command, and the director of operations for U.S. Air Forces in Europe. As the USAFE director of operations, General Hobbins was responsible for the planning, bedding down and execution of combat forces in Europe for Operation Allied Force.

Whilst serving as commander of Air Forces Iceland, Hobbins led the composite wing in the intercept of 80 Soviet bomber aircraft in nine months. During his tenure as Twelfth Air Force commander, General Hobbins deployed the Twelfth Air Force's Air Operations Center to Southwest Asia as operations Enduring Freedom and Iraqi Freedom's alternate AOC prior to the beginning of the hostilities.

A command pilot, as of August 2007 the general has more than 5,000 flying hours, primarily in fighter aircraft.

General Hobbins also stars in a number of Armed Forces Network commercials.

Education
1969 Bachelor of Science degree in business finance, University of Colorado
1976 Squadron Officer School, Maxwell AFB, Alabama
1977 Master's degree in business administration, Troy State University
1981 Armed Forces Staff College, Norfolk, Virginia
1985 Air War College, Maxwell AFB, Alabama
1997 Joint Flag Officer Warfighting Course, Maxwell AFB, Alabama
1999 Joint Force Air Component Commander Course, Maxwell AFB, Alabama
2000 National Security Leadership Course, Syracuse University, New York
2005 Leadership at the Peak, Center for Creative Leadership, Colorado Springs, Colorado

Assignments
January 1970 - December 1970, student, undergraduate pilot training, Laredo AFB, Texas
December 1970 - March 1973, T-28 instructor pilot, 3389th Pilot Training Squadron, Keesler AFB, Mississippi
March 1973 - May 1974, T-38 instructor pilot and class commander, 29th Flying Training Wing, Craig AFB, Alabama
May 1974 - May 1975, AT-28 fighter pilot and chief of quality control, Detachment 19, 1131st Special Activity Squadron, Udon Royal Thai AFB, Thailand
May 1975 - October 1977, chief of T-38 Standardization and Evaluation Division, 29th Flying Training Wing, Craig AFB, Alabama
October 1977 - July 1980, F-15 flight commander, instructor pilot, operations officer, and chief of Wing Scheduling Division, 7th Tactical Fighter Squadron and 49th Tactical Fighter Wing, Holloman AFB, New Mexico
August 1980 - January 1981, student, Armed Forces Staff College, Norfolk, Virginia
January 1981 - July 1984, F-15 operations monitor, F-5 Program Element Monitor, and chief of Weapon Systems Branch, Tactical Division, Directorate of Operations, Headquarters U.S. Air Force, Washington, D.C.
August 1984 - May 1985, student, Air War College, Maxwell AFB, Alabama
May 1985 - April 1987, chief of wing inspections, 33d Tactical Fighter Wing, Eglin AFB, Florida
April 1987 - June 1988, deputy commander of operations, 12th Flying Training Wing, Randolph AFB, Texas
June 1988 - July 1990, vice commander, later, commander of Air Forces Iceland, Keflavik Naval Air Station, Iceland
July 1990 - September 1991, vice commander, later commander, of 405th Tactical Training Wing, Luke AFB, Arizona
September 1991 - June 1992, vice commander of 58th Fighter Wing, Luke AFB, Arizona
July 1992 - July 1994, director of plans and operations, U.S. Forces Japan, Yokota Air Base, Japan
August 1994 - July 1996, commander of 18th Wing, Kadena AB, Japan
August 1996 - April 1998, director of plans and policy, U.S. Atlantic Command, Norfolk, Virginia
April 1998 - July 2000, director of aerospace operations, Headquarters USAFE, Ramstein AB, Germany
August 2000 - September 2002, commander of Twelfth Air Force and U.S. Southern Command Air Forces, and Air Force Component commander, U.S. Strategic Command, Davis-Monthan AFB, Arizona
October 2002 - August 2003, commander of Twelfth Air Force and U.S. Southern Command Air Forces, Davis-Monthan AFB, Arizona
August 2003 - May 2005, Deputy Chief of Staff for Warfighting Integration, Headquarters U.S. Air Force, Washington, D.C.
May 2005 - November 2005, deputy chief of staff for warfighting integration, Headquarters U.S. Air Force, and acting chief of warfighting integration and chief information officer, Office of the Secretary of the Air Force, Washington, D.C.
December 2005 - December 2007, commander of U.S. Air Forces Europe; commander of Air Component Command, Ramstein; and director of Joint Air Power Competence Center, Kalkar, Germany

Flight information
Rating: Command pilot
Flight hours: More than 4,440
Aircraft flown: F-15C, F-15E, C-20, A-10, AT-28 and T-38 Talon

Awards and decorations

 Order of the Rising Sun with Gold Rays
 Mérito Aeronáutico en el grado de Comendador (Bolivian Armed Forces Order of Aeronautical Merit in the grade of "Commander")
Estrella de las Fuerzas Armadas en el Grando de Estrella al Mérito Militar, Ecuador (Star of the Armed Forces in the grade of Star of Military Merit)
 Medalla al Mérito Aeronáutico, Uruguay (Aeronautical Merit)
Medalla al Mérito 1 Clase, Honduras
Cruz al Mérito Aeronáutico, Chile (Meritorious Air Cross Medal)
 Cruz de la Fuerza Aérea, Guatemala (Air Force Cross)
Legion al Mérito Confraternidad Aérea Interamericana (Legion of Merit, System of Cooperation Among the American Air Forces)
 Cruz de la Fuerza Aérea al Mérito Aeronáutica (Colombian Air Force Cross, Aeronautical Merit)
 Orden de Mayo al Merito Aeronautico en el grado de Gran Cruz (Argentine Air Force Cross)
 NATO Meritorious Service Medal
Pilot wings from Cambodia
Pilot wings from Vietnam
1976 Instructor Pilot of the Year
Air Force Association Citation
2007 Order of the Sword, USAFE

Promotion dates
Second lieutenant December 22, 1969
First lieutenant June 22, 1971
Captain February 1, 1973
Major September 1, 1979
Lieutenant colonel December 1, 1982
Colonel April 1, 1988
Brigadier general July 15, 1994
Major general October 1, 1996
Lieutenant general October 1, 2000
General  February 1, 2006

See also
List of commanders of USAFE

References

United States Air Force generals
Recipients of the Legion of Merit
Recipients of the NATO Meritorious Service Medal
Recipients of the Order of the Rising Sun
Living people
Recipients of the Order of the Sword (United States)
1946 births
Recipients of the Defense Superior Service Medal
Recipients of the Defense Distinguished Service Medal
Recipients of the Air Force Distinguished Service Medal